Jimmy Lomba (born 30 June 1978 in Lille, France) is a French athlete who specialises in the 800 metres. Lomba competed at the 2003 World Championships in Athletics.

References

External links

French male middle-distance runners
1978 births
Living people
Sportspeople from Lille